Angell may refer to:

People 
 Angell, a list of people with the surname
 Angell (family), in Norway
 Angell Conwell (born 1983), American actress and model

Fictional characters 
 Jessica Angell, a fictional detective in CSI: NY

Places 
 Angell Woods
 Angell Hall, building at the University of Michigan in Ann Arbor, US
 Angell Street, a major one-way thoroughfare in Providence, Rhode Island

Other uses 
 MSPCA-Angell, an American humane society
 Order of Angell, an honorary society at the University of Michigan
 Angell Hall Observatory, an astronomical observatory at the University of Michigan
 Angell Park Speedway, a dirt racetrack in Sun Prairie, Wisconsin
 Angell Treaty of 1880
 An archaic spelling of angel

See also
 Angel (disambiguation)